Phokion Stavros Plytas, known professionally as Steve Plytas (9 January 1913 – 27 December 1994), was a Greek film and television actor based in the United Kingdom.

His stage work included West End appearances in Tennessee Williams' The Night of the Iguana (1965) and Agatha Christie's The Mousetrap (1970s).

Credited film roles include Passport to Shame, Beyond the Curtain, The Moon-Spinners, The Spy Who Came In from the Cold, Theatre of Death, Interlude, Ooh... You Are Awful, Silver Bears, Revenge of the Pink Panther, Carry On Emmannuelle, The Bitch, Eleni, Superman IV: The Quest for Peace and Batman.

TV credits include: The Avengers, Danger Man, The Troubleshooters, The Saint, Doctor Who (in the serial The Tenth Planet), Z-Cars, The Champions, Department S, Dixon of Dock Green, Man About the House, Fawlty Towers, Who Pays the Ferryman?, The Professionals, Minder, Strangers, The Two Ronnies and Tales of the Unexpected.

Filmography

A Night to Remember (1958) – Greek Steerage Passenger Arguing with James Kieran (uncredited)
Passport to Shame (1958) – French Restaurant Manager
Operation Amsterdam (1959) – Bar Owner (uncredited)
The Treasure of San Teresa (1959) – Station sergeant
Beyond the Curtain (1960) – Zimmerman
Very Important Person (1961) – Luftwaffe Officer
Two Wives at One Wedding (1961) – Bellac
The Pursuers (1961) – Petersen
Light in the Piazza (1962) – Concierge (uncredited)
The Victors (1963) – Waiter (uncredited)
Becket (1964) – Cardinal (uncredited)
The Moon-Spinners (1964) – Hearse Driver
The Spy Who Came In from the Cold (1965) – East German Judge
Those Magnificent Men in their Flying Machines (1965) – Continental Journalist (uncredited)
Theatre of Death (1967) – Andre, Patron of Cafe
Interlude (1968) – Frederico
Duffy (1968) – Moroccan (uncredited)
Vendetta for the Saint (1969) – Cirano
Oh! What a Lovely War (1969) – Turkish Military Attaché (uncredited)
On Her Majesty's Secret Service (1969) – Greek Tycoon (uncredited)
The Executioner (1970) – Police Inspector (uncredited)
Ooh... You Are Awful (1972) – Signor Vittorio Ferruchi
Never Mind the Quality Feel the Width (1973) – Swiss Guard
S*P*Y*S (1974) – Wedding Usher (uncredited)
The Bunny Caper (Sex Play) (1974) – Krashneff
Silver Bears (1977) – Clerk
Revenge of the Pink Panther (1978) – Douvier's Board member
Carry On Emmannuelle (1978) – Arabian Official
The Bitch (1979) – Louis Almond
Orion's Belt (1985) – Russian Ambassador
Eleni (1985) – Christos
The Return Of Sherlock Holmes "The Six Napoleon's" (1986) - Venucci Snr.
Superman IV: The Quest for Peace (1987) – Russian General #2
Batman (1989) – Doctor
Goldeneye (1989) – Dragoumis
Dilemma (1990) – Basil Stratos

References

External links
 

1913 births
1994 deaths
Greek male television actors
Male actors from Istanbul
Greeks from the Ottoman Empire
20th-century Greek male actors
Greek expatriates in the United Kingdom
Greek male film actors
Emigrants from the Ottoman Empire to Greece